José "Yepito" Domingo Nazareno Canga (born 16 July 1997) is an Ecuadorian professional footballer who plays for Charleston Battery as a forward.

Career
Nazareno played with Ecuadorian side Independiente del Valle until 2016, when he signed with United Soccer League side Charleston Battery on 6 May 2016.
,

References

External links

1997 births
Living people
Ecuadorian footballers
Ecuadorian expatriate footballers
Expatriate soccer players in the United States
Charleston Battery players
Association football forwards
USL Championship players